Pooler is a surname. Notable people with the surname include:

Frank Pooler (Wisconsin politician) (1847–1900), American businessman and politician
Frank Pooler (1926–2013), American choirmaster
Lewis Pooler (1858–1924), Anglican priest
Rosemary S. Pooler (born 1938), American judge